Handball Club "Yuvalim" Holon is a handball club from Holon in Israel. HC Holon competes in the Ligat Winner (men), and EHF Challenge Cup (Men) .

Men's team

Team
Squad for the 2019–20 season

Goalkeepers
  Mirza Haseljic 
  Or Cnaani

Wingers
RW
 / Hen Livgot
  Reef Cohen
  Alon Shulman
LW 
  Nadav Nizri
  Aviran Yosef
  Amit Reinesberg

Line players 
 Ido Balanga
 Or Maman

Back players
LB
  Philip Igwe Kalu
  Lior Gurman
  Aviad Ben-Ziman
  Barel Lanciano

CB 
  Eden Gingihashvilli
  Or Levi

RB
  Itamar Dahan 
  Patrick Obbina

Trainer
  Nissim Falach
  Evyatar Givon

External links
 
 EHF Club profile

Israeli handball clubs
Sport in Holon